The list of ship launches in 2000 includes a chronological list of all ships launched in 2000.


References

2000
Ship launches